HIDE and SEEK is the first full-length album by the Japanese rock group Plastic Tree released on July 10, 1997.

Track listing
痛い青　Itai Ao
エーテルノート Ether Note
割れた窓 Wareta Mado
クローゼットチャイルド Closet Child
スノーフラワー  Snow Flower
Hide and Seek #1
トランスオレンジ Trance Orange
真昼の月 Mahiru no Tsuki
水槽。 Suisou
ねじ巻きノイローゼ  Nejimaki Neurose
Hide and Seek # 2

1997 albums
Plastic Tree albums